Carmelita were a Cuban baseball team. They played in the Cuban League in 1887, the Cuban Summer Championship 1904 and 1908 and the Cuban-American Negro Clubs Series in 1904.

1904 players
(Includes Cuban Summer Championship and Cuban-American Series players)
Rafael Almeida
Agustín Acosta
Luis Bustamante
Salustiano Contreras
Augusto Franqui
Manuel Masineira
José Romero

1908 players
Agustín Acosta
José Montes de Oca
Angel Morán
Carlos Morán
Francisco Morán
Jaime Rovira
Manuel Villa

Notes

References

Defunct baseball teams in Cuba
Cuban League teams